This list of former employees of Goldman Sachs catalogs notable alumni of the New York City-based investment bank in different fields.

 Jacob Aarup-Andersen – head of banking for Danske Bank
 Bradley Abelow – Former Chief of Staff and Treasurer of New Jersey under Jon Corzine, and President of MF Global, Inc.
 Guy Adami – CNBC's Fast Money
 Olusegun Olutoyin Aganga – Former Nigerian Finance Minister, current Nigerian Minister for Trade and Investments
 Sergey Aleynikov – Goldman Sachs computer programmer convicted of stealing Goldman's code
 Erik Åsbrink – Minister for Finance of Sweden (1996–1999)
 Cliff Asness - billionaire hedge fund manager, the co-founder of AQR Capital Management.
 Ziad Bahaa-Eldin – Deputy Prime Minister of Egypt (2013–2014)
 Steve Bannon - Former executive chairman of Breitbart News LLC, and Chief Executive Officer of the Donald Trump presidential campaign, 2016
 Chetan Bhagat – Author
 Fischer Black – Co–author of the Black–Scholes equation and the Black-Derman-Toy model
 Lloyd Blankfein – American investment banker, Senior Chairman of Goldman Sachs and former chairman and CEO of Goldman Sachs.
 Joshua Bolten – Former White House Chief of Staff
 António Borges – Portuguese economist and banker
 Diethart Breipohl – Head of Group Finance at Allianz
 Willem Buiter – Chief Economist of Citigroup (2010–)
 Erin Burnett – CNN host
 Mark Carney – Governor of the Bank of England (2013–) and former Governor of the Bank of Canada (2008–2013)
 R. Martin Chavez – American investment banker and entrepreneur, former Goldman Sachs CFO.
 Efthymios Christodoulou – Governor of the Bank of Greece (1991–1993)
 Petros Christodoulou – General Manager of the Public Debt Management Agency of Greece (2010–2012) and Deputy Chief Executive Officer of the National Bank of Greece (2012–)
 Gary Cohn – Director of the National Economic Council and chief economic advisor to President Donald Trump from 2017 to 2018, vice-chairman of IBM
 Michael Cohrs – Member of Court and the Financial Policy Committee at the Bank of England
 Leon Cooperman - billionaire investor, hedge fund manager
 Jon Corzine – Former CEO of MF Global, Inc., former Democratic Governor (2006–2010) and US Senator (2001–2006), New Jersey
 Jim Cramer – Founder of TheStreet.com, best selling author, and host of Mad Money on CNBC
 Charles de Croisset – General Treasurer of Société des amis du Louvre
 Guillermo de la Dehesa – Secretary of State of Economy and Finance of Spain (1986–1988)
 Emanuel Derman – Co-developer of the Black-Derman-Toy model
 Vladimír Dlouhý – Minister of Industry and Trade of the Czech Republic (1992–1997)
 Mario Draghi – President of the European Central Bank (2011–2019)
 William C. Dudley – President of the Federal Reserve Bank of New York
 Rahm Emanuel – Mayor of Chicago (2011–2019)
 Kazuo Inamori – Chairman of Japan Airlines (2010–)
 Óscar Fanjul – Founding Chairman and CEO of Repsol
 Michael D. Fascitelli – President & Trustee of Vornado Realty Trust
 Fang Fenglei – deputy chief executive of China International Capital Corporation
 Henry H. Fowler – Former United States Secretary of the Treasury (1965–1969)
 Gary Gensler – Chairman of the US Commodity Futures Trading Commission (2009–2014) and chairman of the US Securities and Exchange Commission (2021-)
Mark Gilbert – Major League Baseball player, and US Ambassador to New Zealand and Samoa
 Judd Gregg – Governor of New Hampshire (1989–1993) and United States Senator from New Hampshire (1993–2011)
 Chris Grigg – CEO of British Land (2009– )
 Charlie Haas – Wrestler, who is working for World Wrestling Entertainment
 Victor Halbertstadt – Professor of Public Sector Finance at the University of Leiden
 Guy Hands – CEO of Terra Firma Capital Partners
 Jim Himes – member of the House of Representatives (2009–present), representing Connecticut
 Reuben Jeffery III – Under Secretary of State for Economic, Business, and Agricultural Affairs (2007– )
 Neel Kashkari – Former Interim Assistant Secretary of the Treasury for Financial Stability (2008–2009)
 Edward Lampert – Hedge fund manager of ESL Investments. Brought K-Mart out of Bankruptcy in 2003
 Jason Lee – Founder of Dailypay and acquitted of rape  
 Gianni Letta – Secretary to the Council of Ministers of Italy under the governments of Silvio Berlusconi
Matt Levine – columnist for Bloomberg News
 Arthur Levitt – Chairman of the Securities and Exchange Commission (1993–2001)
 Klaus Luft – German businessman and Honorary Consul of Estonia to Bavaria
 Ian Macfarlane – Governor of the Reserve Bank of Australia (1996–2006)
 Stephen Mandel - billionaire investor, hedge fund manager, and philanthropist. He founded Lone Pine Capital
 Tito Mboweni – Governor of the Reserve Bank of South Africa (1999–2009)
 Evan McMullin - Independent candidate for President in the US presidential election, 2016
 Scott Mead – Photographer and an investment banker
 Karel Van Miert – European Commissioner for Transport and Consumer Protection (1989–1993) and European Commissioner for Competition (1993–1999)
 Carlos Moedas – European Commissioner for Research, Science and Innovation
 R. Scott Morris – Former CEO of Boston Options Exchange
 Dambisa Moyo – Zambian economist and author of Dead Aid: Why Aid is Not Working and How There is a Better Way For Africa
 Steven Mnuchin – Former United States Secretary of the Treasury (2017–2020), National Finance Chairman for the Donald Trump 2016 presidential campaign, and Former Chief Information Officer For Goldman Sachs 
 Phil Murphy (D) – Current Governor State of New Jersey
 Ashwin Navin – President and co-founder of BitTorrent, Inc.
 Daniel Och - billionaire investor, hedge fund manager, and philanthropist. He is the founder, chairman and former CEO of Och-Ziff Capital Management Group.
 Dr. Ann Olivarius, Chair, McAllister Olivarius, employment and discrimination lawyer
 Prince Friso of Orange-Nassau – Younger brother of Willem-Alexander of the Netherlands
Andrea Orcel – President of UBS Investment Bank (2014–2018) 
 Lucas Papademos Greek Economist
 Mark Patterson – Chief of Staff to the Secretary of the Treasury of the United States (2009–)
 Henry Paulson – Former United States Secretary of the Treasury (2006–2009)
 Romano Prodi – Prime Minister of Italy (1996–1998, 2006–2008) and President of the European Commission (1999–2004)
 Justin B. Ries – scientist and inventor known for discoveries in the field of global climate change
 Robert Rubin – Former Secretary of the Treasury of the United States, ex–Chairman of Citigroup
Anthony Scaramucci – Former White House Communications Director (2017)
 Harvey Schwartz - American investment banker, former Goldman Sachs CFO and co-COO.
 Robert F. Smith (investor) - Billionaire founder and CEO of private equity firm Vista Equity Partners. Wealthiest African-American.
Robert Steel – Former Chairman and President, Wachovia
 Gene Sperling – Director of the National Economic Council (2011–2014)
 Rishi Sunak - Prime Minister of the United Kingdom (2022-present)
 Peter Sutherland UN representative for refugees; former EU commissioner; former attorney general of Ireland; Chairman Emeritus of GS International.
 David Tepper – billionaire hedge fund manager and owner of NFL team Carolina Panthers
 John Thain – Former Chairman and CEO, Merrill Lynch, and former chairman of the NYSE
 Massimo Tononi – Treasury Undersecretary of the Ministry Of Economy and Finance of  Italy (2006–2008)
 Malcolm Turnbull – Former Prime Minister of Australia (2015-2018)
 George Herbert Walker IV – Chairman and CEO at Neuberger Berman and member of the Bush family
 Thomas B. Walker, Jr. - established Goldman Sachs' presence in the Southwestern United States
Elisha Wiesel – businessman; chief information officer of Goldman Sachs
 Robert Zoellick – United States Trade Representative (2001–2005), Deputy Secretary of State (2005–2006), World Bank President (2007–2012)

References

Goldman Sachs
 
Employees by company